Fleet management software (FMS) is computer software that enables people to accomplish a series of specific tasks in the management of any or all aspects relating to a fleet of vehicles operated by a company, government, or other organisation. These specific tasks encompass all operations from vehicle acquisition through maintenance to disposal.

Fleet management software functions

The main function of fleet management software is to accumulate, store, process, monitor, report on and export information. Information can be imported from external sources such as gas pump processors, territorial authorities for managing vehicle registration (for example DVLA and VOSA), financial institutions, insurance databases, vehicle specification databases, mapping systems and from internal sources such as Human Resources and Finance.

Vehicle management

Fleet management software should be able to manage processes, tasks and events related to all kinds of vehicles - car, trucks, earth-moving machinery, buses, forklift trucks, trailers and specialist equipment, including:

 Vehicle inventory - the number and type of vehicles
 Vehicle maintenance - specific routine maintenance and scheduled maintenance, and ad hoc requirements
 Licensing, registration, MOT and tax 
 Vehicle insurance including due dates and restrictions
 Cost management and analysis
 Vehicle disposal

Driver management
 Driver license management, including special provisions
 Logging of penalty points and infringements against a licence
 Booking system for pool vehicles
Passenger safety (SOS)

Incident management
 Accidents and fines, plus apportioning costs to drivers

Tracking
 Telematics
 Route planning
 Logbooks and work time
 Alerts

Fleet management metrics to track
 Identification Metrics such as vehicle ID, company ID, location ID, Driver ID
 Utilization Metrics such as mileage and fuel data
 Behavioral Metrics like average speed and harsh acceleration
 Trip Metrics like number of trips, average duration
 Maintenance Metrics like maintenance costs and number of diagnostics

Software procurement and development

Fleet management software can be developed in-house by the company or organisation using it, or be purchased from a third party.  It varies greatly in its complexity and cost.

Fleet management software is directly related to fleet management.  It originated on mainframe computers in the 1970s and shifted to the personal computers in the 1980s when it became practical. In later years however, Fleet Management Software has been more efficiently provided as SaaS. Fleet management software has become increasingly necessary and complex as increasing amounts of vehicle related legislation has been brought in.

See also
Vehicle tracking

References

Business software
Transportation planning
Automotive software
Fleet management